Richard Henry Ackerman, C.S.Sp. (August 30, 1903 – November 18, 1992) was an American prelate of the Roman Catholic Church. A member of the Holy Ghost Fathers, he served as Bishop of Covington from 1960 to 1978.

Biography
Richard Ackerman was born in Pittsburgh, Pennsylvania, to John and Josephine (née Richard) Ackerman. After graduating from Duquesne University High School, he entered the Duquesne University School of Drama in 1920. He entered the Congregation of the Holy Ghost in 1921 and made his religious profession at Ridgefield, Connecticut on August 15, 1922. He was ordained to the priesthood by Bishop Maurice F. McAuliffe on August 28, 1926.

Between 1926 and 1940, Ackerman served as master of novices for the Holy Ghost Fathers, assistant pastor of St. Benedict the Moor Parish in Pittsburgh, assistant to the National Director of the Pontifical Association of the Holy Childhood, assistant to the professor of philosophy at St. Mary Seminary in Norwalk, and assistant pastor at St. Mary Parish in Detroit, Michigan. He was named National Director of the Holy Childhood Association in 1941, and Vice-President of the Association's Superior Council in 1947. Upon the Silver Jubilee of his priestly ordination in 1951, he was presented with the Grand Cross Pro Ecclesia et Pontifice by Pope Pius XII.

On April 6, 1956, Ackerman was appointed Auxiliary Bishop of San Diego, California and Titular Bishop of Lares. He received his episcopal consecration on the following May 22 from Bishop John Dearden, with Bishops Jean Gay, C.S.Sp., and Thomas McDonnell serving as co-consecrators, at St. Paul's Cathedral. He was later named the seventh Bishop of Covington, Kentucky by Pope John XXIII on April 4, 1960, and installed at the Cathedral Basilica of the Assumption on the following May 17. From 1962 to 1965, he attended the Second Vatican Council, where he was a member of the conservative Coetus Internationalis Patrum.

Upon reaching the mandatory retirement age of 75, Ackerman resigned as Bishop on November 28, 1978, after 18 years of service. He later died at age 89, and is buried at St. Mary Cemetery in Fort Mitchell.

References

Episcopal succession

1903 births
1992 deaths
Religious leaders from Pittsburgh
Holy Ghost Fathers
Participants in the Second Vatican Council
Coetus Internationalis Patrum
Duquesne University alumni
Roman Catholic bishops of Covington
20th-century Roman Catholic bishops in the United States